1937–38 was the thirtieth occasion on which the Lancashire Cup completion had been held.
Warrington won the trophy by beating Barrow by 8-4. 
The match was played at Central Park, Wigan, (historically in the county of Lancashire). The attendance was 14,000 and receipts were £800.

Background 
The number of teams entering this year’s competition decreased by one with the withdrawal of Streatham & Mitcham, back to the previous total of 13 but the same fixture format was retained. 
There was once again a bye in the first round, and there was still a “blank” or “dummy” fixture. The bye in the second round remained.

Competition and results

Round 1  
Involved  6 matches (with one bye and one “blank” fixture) and 13 clubs

Round 1 - replays  
Involved 1 match

Round 2 – quarterfinals  
Involved 3 matches (with one bye) and 7 clubs

Round 3 – semifinals 
Involved 2 matches and 4 clubs

Final

Teams and scorers 

Scoring - Try = three (3) points - Goal = two (2) points - Drop goal = two (2) points

The road to success

Notes and comments 

1 * Central Park was the home ground of Wigan with a final capacity of 18,000, although the record attendance was  47,747 for Wigan v St Helens 27 March 1959

See also 
1937–38 Northern Rugby Football League season
Rugby league county cups

References

External links
Saints Heritage Society
1896–97 Northern Rugby Football Union season at wigan.rlfans.com
Hull&Proud Fixtures & Results 1896/1897
Widnes Vikings - One team, one passion Season In Review - 1896-97
The Northern Union at warringtonwolves.org

1937 in English rugby league
RFL Lancashire Cup